Alopecia contractures dwarfism mental retardation syndrome or (ACD mental retardation syndrome) is a developmental disorder which causes mainly baldness and dwarfism in combination with intellectual disability; skeletal anomalies, caries and nearsightedness are also typical.

The ACD mental retardation syndrome was first described in 1980 by  Albert Schinzel and only few cases have since been identified in the world. At the time Dr. Schinzel made no conclusion of the hereditary pattern of this syndrome but similarities between  cases reported by year 2000 seem to suggest autosomal or x-linked recessive inheritance or possibly a dominant mutation caused by mosaicism as causes of this syndrome.

References

 Johns Hopkins University: OMIM, Online Mendelian Inheritance in Man, MIM ID 203550

External links 

Syndromes
Syndromes with intellectual disability